The capricorn leaf-eared mouse (Phyllotis caprinus) is a species of rodent in the family Cricetidae.
It is found in Argentina and Bolivia.

References

Musser, G. G. and M. D. Carleton. 2005. Superfamily Muroidea. pp. 894–1531 in Mammal Species of the World a Taxonomic and Geographic Reference. D. E. Wilson and D. M. Reeder eds. Johns Hopkins University Press, Baltimore.

Phyllotis
Mammals described in 1958
Taxonomy articles created by Polbot